Will Currie & The Country French is a Canadian indie rock music group formed in 2006 in Waterloo.  The band consists of singer and pianist Will Currie, guitarist Dan Beacock, drummer Aaron Mariash, and bassist Daniel MacPherson.

Biography
Will Currie & The Country French was originally conceived in early 2006 as a few songs were written in a small glass room in the basement of the Music Faculty at Wilfrid Laurier University. Currie later assembled a small troupe of fellow music students to form a piano pop band. They began to tour around southern Ontario, and in 2007 caught the attention of Jay Ferguson of Sloan, who said they were the best live band he had seen that year, and signed them to his Murderecords music label.

Their debut EP, A Great Stage, was released in early 2008 by Murderecords. They toured western Canada with Sloan in September 2008. The two bands together recorded Will Currie's composition "Push Pins" in 2008, in which Currie duets with Jay Ferguson on vocals.

"Push Pins" won a 2008 CBC Radio 3 Bucky Award for Best Collaboration.

The band released "Awake! You Sleepers", under the label File Under: Music in 2011, and has played across Canada with artists such as Arkells, Dan Mangan, Said the Whale, Our Lady Peace, Library Voices, Zeus, and many more.

Their next record, "They Killed Us," is set for release with File Under: Music in June 2015.

Discography

LPs
"They Killed Us" (9 June 2015, File Under: Music)
Awake, You Sleepers! (11 October 2011, File Under: Music)

EPs
A Great Stage (29 April 2008, Murderecords)

References

Musical groups established in 2006
Musical groups from the Regional Municipality of Waterloo
Canadian indie rock groups
Murderecords artists
2006 establishments in Ontario